Rumah Melaka is a gallery owned by the Malaysian Timber Industry Board located in Bukit Katil, Malacca, Malaysia that promotes wooden handmade products of the local people. It was built on an area of 5 hectares with a cost of MYR5 million, as a project in cooperation with the Malacca State Government.

See also
 List of tourist attractions in Malacca

References

External links
 Rumah Melaka MTIB

Art museums and galleries in Melaka